The American Legend Cooperative (ALC) was an agricultural marketing cooperative of mink fur farmers in the United States and Canada, best known for its Blackglama, American Legend brands of fur, as well as the older LEGEND brand.  American Legend was formed in 1986 as a merger of the Great Lakes Mink Association (GLMA) and the Mutation Mink Breeders Association (EMBA). It was acquired by North American Fur Auctions in 2018.

The Great Lakes Mink Association (GLMA) was formed in 1941 by mink breeders in the Great Lakes region of the United States who bred a black-furred mink which they characterize as "the richest, deepest, most lustrous dark mink with the lightest, most flexible leather", and trademarked it as Blackglama. Their long-running advertising campaign is known by the tagline "What becomes a legend most?", featuring a series of celebrities modeling their furs.  The name "Blackglama" is a play on the word "glamor" and the initialism "GLMA".

The Mutation Mink Breeders Association (MMBA) was formed in 1942 by mink ranchers specializing in clear bright fur colors, to which they gave distinctive trade names: Autumn Haze (brown), Desert Gold (light brown), Argenta (grey), Cerulean (blue), Lutetia (gunmetal), Azurene (pale grey), Jasmine (white), Tourmaline (pale beige), Arcturus (lavender beige), Diadem (pale brown), Aeolian (grey taupe). In 1948, they adopted the name EMBA; EMBA used the trademark "The American Mink".

In April 2018, North American Fur Auctions acquired the American Legend Cooperative and its Blackglama brand.

Membership
Membership in the American Legend Cooperative was open to active mink farmers in the United States or Canada who have sold over 1200 mink pelts at American Legend auctions within the previous year and who are approved by the cooperative's Board of Directors.

'Blackglama - What Becomes a Legend Most' Spokesmodels
1968: Lauren Bacall, Bette Davis, Judy Garland, Melina Mercouri, Barbra Streisand
1969: Joan Crawford, Marlene Dietrich, Lena Horne
1970: Brigitte Bardot, Maria Callas, Rita Hayworth, Leontyne Price, Barbara Stanwyck, Rosalind Russell
1971: Claudette Colbert, Paulette Goddard, Ruby Keeler
1972: Pearl Bailey, Carol Burnett, Carol Channing, Ethel Merman
1973: Peggy Lee, Liza Minnelli, Diana Ross
1975: Mary Martin, Beverly Sills, Raquel Welch
1976: Martha Graham, Margot Fonteyn, Lillian Hellman, Rudolf Nureyev
1977: Shirley MacLaine, Suzy Knickerbocker, Liv Ullmann, Diana Vreeland
1978: Faye Dunaway, Joan Fontaine (later reprinted as the cover of her autobiography 'No Bed of Roses'), Helen Hayes
1979: Lillian Gish, Angela Lansbury, Renata Scotto
1980: Myrna Loy, Ann Miller, Maggie Smith, Lana Turner
1981: Luciano Pavarotti, Gloria Swanson, Natalie Wood
1982: Julie Andrews, Sophia Loren
1983: Elizabeth Taylor
1984: Lucille Ball, Dinah Shore
1985: Ann-Margret
1986: Cher
1987: Audrey Hepburn
1988: Catherine Deneuve
1990: Ray Charles
1991: Jessica Tandy
1992: Jessye Norman
1993: Debbie Reynolds
1994: Tommy Tune
2001: Linda Evangelista
2002: Gisele Bündchen
2004: Cindy Crawford
2005: Elle Macpherson
2007: Naomi Campbell
2008: Elizabeth Hurley
2010, 2011: Janet Jackson
2012: Ginta Lapina
2013: Carolyn Murphy
2014: Hilary Rhoda
2015: Jessica Stam
2017: Daphne Groeneveld

Communications
ALC is a founding member of the North American Fur Industry Communications group (NAFIC), established in 2013 as a cooperative public educational program for the fur industry in Canada and the USA. Its slogan is "Truth About Fur".

References

External links
 American Legend
 Blackglama 
 American Legend Auctions
 ALC Business

Agricultural marketing cooperatives
Fur
Cooperatives in the United States